Torsåker is a locality situated in Hofors Municipality, Gävleborg County, Sweden with 899 inhabitants in 2010. It contains a parish for the Archdiocese of Uppsala. The church at Torsåker has two runestones, Gs 7 and Gs 8.

Etymology
Torsåker has the Norse pagan god Thor as an element along with Old Norse akr or áker, "arable land." The typical translation for the name is "Thor's field" and was often originally used as the name of a farm.

Notable people
Elov Persson (1894-1970), Swedish cartoonist and comic artist
Erik Gabrielsson Emporagrius (1606-1674), Swedish professor and bishop
Kerstin Hesselgren (1872–1962), first woman elected into the upper house of Swedish parliament

References

External links
Torsåker vicars

Populated places in Hofors Municipality
Gästrikland